The Sweden  National Renewable Energy Action Plan is the National Renewable Energy Action Plan (NREAP) for Sweden. The plan was commissioned by the Directive 2009/28/EC which required Member States of the European Union to notify the European Commission with a road map. The report describes how Sweden planned to achieve its legally binding target of a 49% share of energy from renewable sources in gross final consumption of energy by 2020.

Main targets in Sweden 
In the NREAP, the Federal Government estimates the share of renewable energies in gross final energy consumption to be 50.2% in 2020. The share of renewable energies in the electricity sector will thereby amount to 62.8%, the share in the heating/cooling sector will be 62%, while in the transport sector it will amount to 12.4%.

Main incentives and laws in Sweden 
The Swedish licensing and legislative system is so structured that the Swedish Parliament and the Government govern through laws and regulations that are applied by national authorities that autonomously interpret and implement these laws and regulations. At a national level, there are regional government authorities and county administrative boards that have the task of coordinating and implementing the targets and mandates stipulated by the national authorities. 

Special for Wind Power 

There are four wind power coordinators and a national network for wind power within the area of wind power. Furthermore, the Swedish Energy Agency has, on behalf of the Government, developed an Internet-based manual about wind power (Vindlov.se) for all of the information that is needed for licensing matters regarding wind power and information on most things from concept stage to the commissioning of the completed wind farm. 

Special for Solar Power 

Solar heating installations need to meet certain quality standards in order to benefit from solar heating funding.
 
Financial Support Systems in Sweden
The Electricity certificate scheme
Support for planning initiatives for wind power
Governmental support for solar photovoltaic cells
Aid for investment in solar energy

Renewable energy policy
Action plans
Renewable energy in Sweden